Trickfinger II is the second studio album by Trickfinger, the alias of musician John Frusciante, released on 8 September 2017 on the AcidTest label. The six songs were recorded in 2007 at the same time as his full-length Trickfinger album.

Background
Like its predecessor, the former Red Hot Chili Peppers guitarist recorded the music for Trickfinger II back in 2007. Using a fleet of hardware synths and drum machines, the six-track LP was recorded live onto a CD burner, through a cheap mixer. John would sit on a chair, in his living room, surrounded by five to 15 machines, and just keep programming and jamming until the track was ready to be recorded. There were no overdubs – recorded all live. The music was never intended for release and made purely for discovery and learning experience, but Frusciante eventually agreed to publish the recordings on Oliver Bristow's Acid Test, which has been home to the likes of Donato Dozzy, Recondite and Tin Man. Trickfinger II was made available on vinyl, CD and as a digital download. He has said this about the making of the Trickfinger albums:

Acid Test unearthed these recordings and John agreed to a release. Trickfinger II is the second part to the recordings made during the winter of 2007.

Track listing

References

2017 EPs
John Frusciante EPs